John William Turnbull  (29 August 1905 – 20 August 1979) was an English Anglican priest.

Early life
The 2nd son of William and Elizabeth Turnbull, he was educated at Durham University and Edinburgh Theological College.

Religious life
 Ordained Deacon, 1934
 Ordained, Priest 1935
 Curate of Horton, Northumberland, 1934–36
 Curate of Alnwick, 1936–41
 Vicar of Longbenton, 1941–48
 Vicar of All Saints’, Gosforth, 1948–62
 Canon Residentiary of Ripon Cathedral, 1962–76
 Archdeacon of Richmond, 1962–76 from 1962 to 1976.

References

1905 births
Archdeacons of Richmond
Alumni of Edinburgh Theological College
Alumni of Durham University
1979 deaths